The 2010 Tri-Cities Fever season was the team's sixth season as a professional indoor football franchise and first in the Indoor Football League (IFL). One of twenty-five teams competing in the IFL for the 2010 season, the Kennewick, Washington-based Tri-Cities Fever were members of the Pacific Division of the Intense Conference.

Under the leadership of head coach Adam Shackleford, the team played their home games at the Toyota Center in Kennewick, Washington.

The Fever lost to the Billings Outlaws 45-54 in the 2010 First Round.

Schedule

Regular season

Playoffs

Standings

Roster

References

External links
Tri-Cities Fever official website
Tri-Cities Fever official statistics
Tri-Cities Fever at Tri-City Herald

Tri-Cities Fever
Tri-Cities Fever seasons
Tri-Cities Fever